Mannar Thirumalai Naicker College is founded by Tamilnadu Naidu Mahajan Sangam in Madurai, Tamil Nadu. It was established in 1974 and is affiliated with Madurai Kamaraj University. This college offers courses in Science, Arts, Commerce and Business Administration.

Programmes

Aided Programme
@ UG Programmes @
 B.A. History
 B.A. English Literature
 B.A. Economics
 B.Sc. Mathematics
 B.Sc. Physics
 B.Com.
 B.B.A.

@ PG and Research Programmes @
 M.Sc. Mathematics
 M.Com.
 Ph.D. Commerce
 Ph.D. English
 Ph.D. Mathematics
 Ph.D. Tamil

Self - Financed Programmes
@ UG Programmes @
 B.Com.
 B.Com. (Computer Application)
 B.Com. Corporate Secretaryship
 B.B.A.
 B.S.W.
 B.A. English
 B.A. Tamil
 B.Sc. Computer Science
 B.Sc. Information Technology
 B.C.A.
 B.Sc. Electronics and Communications
 B.Sc. Maths and Computer Applications
 B.Sc. Chemistry
 B.Sc. Food and Dairy Technology
 B.Sc. Microbiology
@ PG Programmes @
 M.Sc. Computer Science
 M.Sc. Mathematics
 M.Com. Computer Applications
 M.S.W.
 M.A. English
 M.A. Tamil
 M.Phil. Commerce
 M.Phil. English
 M.Phil. Mathematics

Community College 
@ Diploma Programme @

 Retail Management
 Fashion Technology and Apparel Designing
 Counseling & Psychotherapy
 Food Processing and Quality Management
 Green House Technology
 Beauty and Wellness

@ Degree Programmes @

 Accounting & Taxation
 Software Development

Facilities 

 Digital Library

 Physical Education
 NSS
 NCC
 Various Club
 Conference and Seminar Halls
 Laboratories - Computer Science (5 Labs)
 Laboratories - Physics
 Laboratories - Chemistry
 Laboratories - Food and Dairy
 Laboratories - Microbiology 
 Laboratories - E & C
 Audio & Video Lab
Placement Cell
 Gym
 Hostel 
 Canteen
RO Water

Accreditation
The college is recognized by the University Grants Commission (UGC).

NIRF,

NAAC,

AISHE

External links
http://www.mannarcollege.ac.in/

Educational institutions established in 1974
1974 establishments in Tamil Nadu
Colleges affiliated to Madurai Kamaraj University
Colleges in Madurai
Universities and colleges in Madurai district
Universities and colleges in Madurai